This is a list of museums in Slovakia.

Andy Warhol Museum of Modern Art
Bratislava City Gallery
Bratislava City Museum
Bratislava Transport Museum
East Slovak Gallery
East Slovak Museum
House of the Good Shepherd
Museum of Danube Komarno
Museum of the Slovak Village
Orthodox synagogue in Bratislava
Slovak National Gallery
Slovak National Museum
Slovak National Museum in Martin
Slovak Red Cross Museum
Slovak Technical Museum
Small Carpathian Museum
St. Urban Tower

See also 

Open-air museums in Slovakia
Museums and galleries of Bratislava
List of museums
Tourism in Slovakia
Culture of Slovakia

Museums
 
Museums
Slovakia
Museums
Slovakia